The 1932 Italian Grand Prix was a Grand Prix motor race held at Monza on 5 June 1932.

Classification

Race

Starting grid positions

References

Italian Grand Prix
Italian Grand Prix
Grand Prix